Edinah Jebitok (born 10 November 2001) is a Kenyan athlete. She competed in the women's 1500 metres event at the 2020 Summer Olympics.

References

External links
 

2001 births
Living people
Kenyan female middle-distance runners
Athletes (track and field) at the 2018 African Youth Games
Athletes (track and field) at the 2020 Summer Olympics
Olympic athletes of Kenya
Place of birth missing (living people)
Athletes (track and field) at the 2018 Summer Youth Olympics
Youth Olympic gold medalists for Kenya
21st-century Kenyan women